The Hindenburg disaster has featured in a variety of popular culture films, TV programs and books.

Film
The Hindenburg is a 1975 film about the disaster. Although much of the storyline is fictional, they were based on real bomb threats before the flight began, as well as proponents of the sabotage theory.

Hindenburg is a 2011 made-for-TV film starring Maximillian Simonischek, Lauren Lee Smith, Stacy Keach and Greta Scacchi. It was initially aired on RTL dubbed in German as a two-part series and later released as a DVD in English. It was aired in US in 2013 on Encore. Similar to the 1975 film, it focuses on the sabotage theory, though much of the storyline is completely fictional.

The 2015 film The Dust Storm includes a song called Hindenburg - a reference to the disaster.

In the 2022 crime/mystery movie, Glass Onion: A Knives Out Mystery, the characters repeatedly referred to the Hindenburg tragedy.

Literature
In the Neal Stephenson novel Cryptonomicon the fictional character Lawrence Waterhouse is atop a fire tower in the Pine Barrens when he is "distracted by a false sunrise that lit up the clouds off to the northeast." Upon reaching the scene the author describes a disjointed scene of news reporters, an intense fire, people carrying charred bodies onto stretchers, and "a rocket-shaped pod stuck askew from the sand, supporting an umbrella of bent-back propellers". Lawrence Waterhouse returns to the campsite and remarks, "Also I dreamed last night that a zeppelin was burning".

In the 2001 novel Passage by Connie Willis, the Hindenburg disaster is referred to at length, as the favorite disaster of Maisie, a little girl with heart problems and a passion for famous disasters, in the hospital where Dr. Joanna Lander, the main character, is investigating near-death experiences.

Love and Hydrogen, by Jim Shepard, deals with two crew men aboard the Hindenburg, Meinert and Gnüss, and their hidden love. The story takes place a day before the explosion and the moment of.

In book three of The Pendragon Adventures by D. J. MacHale: The Never War, the Hindenburg disaster is the major event to change first earth. The Travelers eventually realize that the Hindenburg disaster must happen to prevent larger disasters such as an atomic bomb dropped on the U.S.

In The Martian by Andy Weir, during The Great Hydrogen Scare of Sol 37, Watney states how the Hab is his private Hindenburg, ready to explode.

A son, Henning Boëtius, of one of the ship's officers,  wrote a novel, The Phoenix. The novel is based on accounts Henning's father gave of the disaster.

In The Hindenburg Murders by Max Allan Collins, a fictionalised version of thriller author Leslie Charteris investigates possible sabotage on the airship.

In the Marvel Comics magazine Bizarre Adventures #25 (cover dated March 1981), it is revealed that in the Marvel Universe, the Hindenburg was destroyed in a battle between the sorceress Lady Megan Daemon and her evil sister Alisabeth.

Music
Blues musician Lead Belly wrote a song titled, "The Hindenburg Disaster" (1937). This song can be heard on the record Leadbelly: The Library of Congress Recordings, recorded by John A. Lomax and Alan Lomax for Folkways Music Publishers.

The cover of Led Zeppelin's self-titled debut album shows a stylized photo of the Hindenburg disaster with the band's name in the upper left corner.  The band's name is a reference to a popular catchphrase that refers to something, such as a joke, that falls flat; "That went over like a lead zeppelin."  The band changed the spelling of "lead" to "led" so that it wouldn't be confused with "lead" as in a "lead singer" or "lead guitar".

The song "The Blimp" by Captain Beefheart and the Magic Band as issued on their 1969 Straight Records album Trout Mask Replica is a parody of Morrison's live description of the disaster as aired on radio the following day.

The satirical song "Smash Flop Hits" by Phil Ochs includes a verse about the Hindenburg disaster.

The song, "From The Sky", by Protest The Hero (Palimpsest, 2020) uses the disaster as an allegory for the glorification of historical events despite society's selective memory of details that do not fit the desired narrative.

Television
In season 1, episode 4 of Entourage, Ari suggests to Vince that his next movie should be Hindenburg, stating that "It's like Titanic on a blimp." No further reference is made in the episode.

In season 2, episode 17 of Beyond Belief: Fact or Fiction, the twist at the end of "Bon Voyage" reveals that the story has been taking place on the Hindenburg moments before the crash.  At the end of the episode, the story was revealed to be fictional.

Seinfeld made at least two references to the disaster.  At the end of the episode "The Pothole", Newman's mail truck erupts into flames (after a series of events caused by Kramer), causing him to cry out, "Oh, the humanity!"  The episode "The Puerto Rican Day" features a subplot in which George attempts to deliver a comical line ("That's gotta hurt!") during the fiery climax of the (fictional) film Blimp: The Hindenburg Story.

In The Sopranos episode, "Kaisha", Phil Leotardo notes the disappearance of Fat Dom Gamiello, and surmises that the Sopranos family killed Dom because he was last seen in New Jersey. Tony Soprano denies that claim, emphasizing the lack of evidence to support it, and adds: "The Hindenburg was last seen in New Jersey, too".

In the 1992 episode of The Simpsons, "Lisa the Beauty Queen", the Hindenburg disaster is parodied as Barney Gumble pilots the Duff Beer blimp with disastrous results, culminating with Kent Brockman reporting the scene by stating, "Oh, the humanity!  Anyway...".  Four years later in the episode "Bart the Fink", Bart receives a check book depicting the Hindenburg disaster in flip-book fashion, referred to as "Check Style No. 9 'Oh the Humanity...'".

In Rescue Me's first-season episode "Kansas", Sean Garrity learns about the Hindenburg disaster after his crew made fun of him for not knowing what it was.

The Hindenburg disaster is chronicled in the popular 1970s television drama, The Waltons where John Boy Walton wins a writing contest to cover the landing of the Hindenburg, witnessing the unforeseen tragedy in person. Original newsreel footage of the event was integrated into the episode's scenes.

On the popular CBS situation comedy WKRP in Cincinnati episode "Turkeys Away" the depiction of falling turkeys by Les Nessman is intended to emulate Herbert Morrison's broadcast.

In season 4 of the sitcom 'Til Death, Brad Garrett's character Eddy is writing a book on the Hindenburg disaster.

In the season 11 episode of Family Guy titled "Yug Ylimaf", Brian goes back in time to the Hindenburg disaster to have sex with a woman he met.  They use the footage of the disaster in that scene and add Brian and the girl to the footage. In the season 4 episode titled "The Cleveland-Loretta Quagmire", Peter Griffin owns a zeppelin with his face on it that he calls the "Hindenpeter".

On The Richard Bey Show they used the audio from the disaster as a sound effect, specifically the "Oh the humanity!" line.

Victor Rjesnjansky on A&E's Storage Wars: Texas often refers to his competitors, Ricky and Bubba, as "the Hindenburgs", a reference to their portly physique.

In the Archer episode "Skytanic", which takes place on board an airship, Archer makes several references to the Hindenburg due to his paranoia about the airship catching fire, despite the airship's captain repeatedly telling him that the ship uses non-flammable helium.

In The Amazing World of Gumball episode "The Void", while Gumball, Darwin, and Mr. Small escape from the dimension that Molly is trapped in (full of all the mistakes the world has ever made), they all jump upon an airship resembling the Hindenburg that then catches fire and crashes into a structural pylon, much like the disaster.

In the Rocko's Modern Life episode "Feisty Geist", while visiting a fortune teller, Heffer Wolfe is told of his past lives, and one of them is of when he was a hungry passenger aboard the airship Hillenburger (also a play on the name of the show's creative director Stephen Hillenburg). The German Heffer runs for the buffet, causing the zeppelin to lower and crash-land in a fireball, sending him flying.

The CatDog episode "CatDogPig" featured a blimp advertising job interviews as a running gag throughout the episode. At the end, the blimp crashes into a pile of characters that CatDog had just dumped off, exploding and sending them all flying.

In the Pokémon anime during the start of the Orange Islands saga (specifically the episodes "A Scare in the Air," "Poké Ball Peril" and "The Lost Lapras"),our heroes travel on a blimp (fashioned with a metal framework on the inside just like a zeppelin), and whenever Ash orders Pikachu to use one of his electric attacks, Ash is warned not to do so, as Pikachu's electricity could ignite the inflammable gas and make the blimp explode (referencing how static electricity most likely had a large part to play in the Hindenburg disaster). The blimp eventually does explode when crash-landing on an island in "The Lost Lapras," but our heroes are not hurt.

In the Blue Mountain State episode "The Corn Field Pt. 1", the incident is referenced by Harmon when discussing a large joint of weed. The line "Oh the humanity!" is used jokingly by Donnie who is promptly ostracized by Larry for making light of the tragedy.

The pilot episode of the NBC TV series Timeless (3 October 2016) revolves around a criminal who steals a time machine in an effort to alter the events of the past, starting with the Hindenburg disaster. In the episode, a journalist standing directly under the Hindenburg gets killed when it crashes down (in the original timeline). Historically, however, it was a man on the ground docking crew who died.

Multiple episodes of J. J. Abrams's FOX series, Fringe, take place in a parallel universe, an identifying characteristic of which is the modern-day popularity of airships due to the non-occurrence of the Hindenburg disaster in that universe.

Devious Maids season four episode eight, Adrian and Evelyn toast their divorce with a bottle of 1932 Riesling salvaged from the Hindenburg.

Television investigations
The Discovery Channel series MythBusters explored the incendiary paint hypothesis and the hydrogen hypothesis in an episode that aired January 10, 2007. While their experiments did not concern what actually started the fire, the show's hosts, Adam Savage and Jamie Hyneman, demonstrated that when set alight with a blowtorch a 1:50 scale model of the Hindenburg burnt twice as fast in the presence of diffused hydrogen as without it. Combustion was observed in the burning skin, which would have accelerated the fire, but their experiments showed that hydrogen was the main fuel. The hydrogen-filled model produced a fire with flames that came out of the nose and resembled the newsreel footage of the Hindenburg disaster. That program concluded that the incendiary paint theory (IPT) myth was "Busted".

The MythBusters constructed three 1/50 scale models made out of welded steel wire and covered in cotton fabric. They were suspended from a hangar ceiling and stayed horizontal the entire time. The first model was painted with iron-oxide and then aluminum powder dopes, closely replicating the actual skin of the Hindenburg. Ignited with a blowtorch, it took about 2 minutes to burn, with thermite-like events (sparkling blazes) noted in a few places. The second model had the same skin, but a water trough inside diffused hydrogen gas at sub-explosive concentrations. This one burned about twice as fast, with more thermite burning. The third model, done more for spectacle than anything else, had the skin painted with a thermite-like iron-oxide and aluminum powder enriched dope. It was noted that it would probably be far too heavy to fly. With model 2's hydrogen enrichment, it took 30 seconds to completely consume the skin. The conclusion was that neither the hydrogen gas nor the flammable skin bore sole responsibility for the speed of the fire, but both contributed.

The National Geographic Channel program Seconds From Disaster had veteran air crash investigator Greg Feith study all of the available evidence, including eyewitness accounts, interviews with the last two living survivors, newsreel footage, weather reports, and the Hindenburg blueprints. Feith burned a sample of doped cloth and it took one minute to consume the whole piece, ruling out the skin as the primary accelerant. Feith's investigation came to a conclusion that the hydrogen puncture hypothesis was most probable. He also proved that by adding white cloth to a hydrogen flame that it would change the fire's color from invisible to orange.

In Search of..., a show mainly focused on paranormal investigations and conspiracy theories, made an episode based on this tragic accident, and immediately raised the question of whether it was really an accident or instead sabotage by then-Nazi Germany.

Internet
In the shared alternate history of Ill Bethisad (1997 and after), an analogue of the Hindenburg disaster called the "Dornburg Disaster" appears. The aircraft was called the Dornburg Db-VI (known colloquially in German as "Debe-Sechs"), a flying boat style airplane which was designed in 1935 and built in late 1936 by its namesake, engineer Klaus von Dornburg (a fictional character) from Germany. In the fictional alternate universe setting of Ill Bethisad, airships overtook airplanes as the main form of air transport already in the 1930s and the Dornburg was intended to show off the advantages of the airplane compared to the airship (such as a faster speed). The test fight of the Dornburg was on 3 January 1936 and a flight with the media on board for publicity took place on 15 March. Full commercial flights of the Dornburg began on 2 April which operated by Lufthansa. There was only one Dornburg Db-VI ever made but before the disaster, there were plans to build more advanced versions starting in 1939. The disaster occurs on 6 May 1938 (exactly 1 year after the real life Hindenburg disaster) during a flight in South America from  Natal, in Bahia (a fictional country in the setting) to Rio de Janeiro in Brasil (a much smaller country then its real world counterpart Brazil). The Dornburg was about to land in Rio and was flying to Guanabara Bay when a gusts of wind forces it to make two sharp turns. The plane flies past Sugarloaf Mountain at 2:32pm but a few seconds later, one of the engines caught fire which quickly engulfed the plane which then fell into the bay, sinking there before any rescue attempt could be made. the disaster killed all 58 passengers and 18 crew members on board, a total of 76 deaths in total. The day after, the local newspaper Jornal do Brasil published photos of the crash with the headline "Isto é desumano" (meaning "This is inhuman" in Portuguese) on its front cover. The headline became world famous and had a major impact on how the world viewed airplanes. As a result of the disaster and the publicity surrounding it, public confidence of airplanes was permanently shattered and the airship quickly overtook the airplane as the most common form of air transport. In the present day, airships are used for civilian uses such as airlines, while airplanes are now relegated to military use with no passenger carrying planes built since the Dornburg crash. The airplanes that do exist are much less advanced compared to reality with many air forces still having propeller airplanes and the jet planes created in the 2000s there use designs that in real life date from the 1940s and 1950s. In addition, the development of jet engines happens later and is much slower than in real life with the first all-jet air force not set to exist until 2025. Also, the rock band "Lead Aeroplane" (an fictional analogue of Led Zeppelin) is named after the disaster and used the Jornal do Brasil front page showing the crash as the cover of their self-titled debut album in 1971, with their logo replacing the paper's nameplate.

References

disaster in popular culture
Airships in fiction
Fire in culture
Aviation accidents and incidents in fiction